Bravish Shetty (born 27 October 1987) is an Indian cricketer. He made his List A debut on 27 February 2014, for Mumbai in the 2013–14 Vijay Hazare Trophy. He made his first-class debut for Mumbai in the 2014–15 Ranji Trophy on 7 December 2014.

Ahead of the 2018–19 Ranji Trophy, he transferred from Mumbai to Tripura. He was the leading run-scorer for Tripura in the 2018–19 Vijay Hazare Trophy, with 256 runs in seven matches.

References

External links
 

1987 births
Living people
Indian cricketers
Mumbai cricketers
Tripura cricketers
Place of birth missing (living people)